Ivan John Enrile Uy is a Filipino lawyer and IT Expert who is currently the Secretary of the Department of Information and Communications Technology (DICT) since June 30, 2022.

Education
Uy attended the Ateneo de Manila University where he gained his Bachelor’s degree then went to University of the Philippines where he obtained a law degree in 1988. As of 2022, he is also a Humphrey fellow of the University of Minnesota in the United States.

Career
Ivan John Uy has been involved with the Philippine Chamber of Commerce and Industry (PCCI) as its corporate secretary and chairman of Philippine Business Conference Resolutions Committee.

Uy also was part of the Supreme Court of the Philippines, first joining the high court as a legal researcher before becoming the chief information officer during the tenure of Chief Justice Hilario Davide Jr.

He was also appointed as chairman of the Commission on Information and Communications Technology by President Benigno Aquino III in 2010 before the body was dissolved in 2011. He oversaw the conceptualization of the Philippine Digital Strategy 2011–2016.

President-elect Bongbong Marcos designated Uy as Secretary of the Department of Information and Communications Technology (DICT), succeeding acting secretary Emmanuel Rey Caintic. Uy pledged to advance digital literacy, particularly by promoting digital hygiene in elementary schools to mitigate the impact cybercrime.

References

|-

University of the Philippines alumni
20th-century Filipino lawyers
Benigno Aquino III administration personnel
Duterte administration personnel
Living people
Year of birth missing (living people)
Bongbong Marcos administration cabinet members